The 28th Lo Nuestro Awards ceremony, presented by the American network Univision, honoring the best Latin music of 2015 in the United States, took place on February 18, 2016, at the American Airlines Arena in Miami, Florida beginning at 5:00 p.m. PST (8:00 p.m. EST). During the ceremony, Lo Nuestro Awards were presented in 26 categories. The ceremony was televised in the United States by Univision. Mexican actors Galilea Montijo and Arath de la Torre hosted the show.

American singer-songwriter Nicky Jam, Puerto-Rican American singer Ricky Martin and Spanish artist Enrique Iglesias earned three awards each, including Pop/Rock Album of the Year and Pop Song of the Year for Martin; American reggaeton performer J Balvin received the Artist of the Year accolade. Colombian singer-songwriter Carlos Vives received the Excellence Award and several performers including Balvin, Colombian artists Fonseca, Juanes and Maluma, performed a medley of his greatest hits during the show. Mexican artist Paquita la del Barrio earned the Trajectory Award. The telecast garnered in average 11 million viewers in North America.

Winners and nominees 
 
 The nominees for the 28th Lo Nuestro Awards were announced on December 1, 2015. American singer-songwriter Romeo Santos with seven nominations became the most nominated act, followed by Dominican artist Juan Luis Guerra with six. Puerto Rican singer Ricky Martin earned three awards, including Pop/Rock Album of the Year for his album A Quien Quiera Escuchar which also won the Grammy Award for Best Latin Pop Album; Pop Song of the Year for "Disparo al Corazón", a track nominated for Record of the Year and Song of the Year at the 16th Latin Grammy Awards; and Video of the Year for the single "La Mordidita" featuring Yotuel.

Puerto Rican performer Nicky Jam earned three awards, including two shared with Spanish singer-songwriter Enrique Iglesias, for the single "El Perdón. Jam also received the Lo Nuestro Award for Urban Artist of the Year while Iglesias won for Pop Male Artist. The Artist of the Year was American reggaeton artist J Balvin, and Mexican singer Gerardo Ortiz won the first Album of the Year award for Hoy Más Fuerte. Colombian singer-songwriter received the Excellence Award and Mexican artist Paquita la del Barrio was recognized for her musical career.

Winners are listed first and indicated in bold and with a double-dagger.

Presenters and performers
The following individuals and groups, listed in order of appearance, presented awards or performed musical numbers.

Presenters

Note: The remaining awards were announced at the Lo Nuestro Awards website.

Performers

Source:

Ceremony information

Categories and voting process
The categories considered were for the Pop, Tropical, Regional Mexican, and Urban genres, with additional awards for the General Field that includes nominees from all genres, for the Artist of the Year, Album of the Year, New Artist, Collaboration and Music Video categories. The nominees were selected through an online voting poll at the official website from December 1-20, 2015; the winners were chosen from a total 26 different categories. The ceremony was hosted by Mexican actors Galilea Montijo and Arath de la Torre.

Ratings and reception
The American telecast on Univision drew in an average 11 million people during its three hours of length. Univision was second and third in the ratings during its first two and a half hour, but rose to number one in the last 30 minutes of the broadcast. According to Glenn Santana of the newspaper Primera Hora, the ratings were the lowest since 2011, and in 2016 faced strong competition from other networks such as WAPA-TV and Telemundo with the TV series Fatmagül and Celia, respectively.

See also
2015 in Latin music
Latin Grammy Awards of 2015

References

2016 music awards
Lo Nuestro Awards by year
2016 in Florida
2016 in Latin music
2010s in Miami